The China Chess League (CCL) is a Chinese professional league for chess clubs. The league is organized by the Chinese Chess Association. It is sponsored by Youngor Group and was sponsored by the Shandong Torch Real Estate Group (2005–2009) and it has been able to determine the league's sponsorship name. Seasons usually run from April to November each year. The league is contested by 10 clubs. Under the rules of the league each team is allowed to register seven Chinese players and an unlimited quota of foreign players. The rules require five boards with at least two female players and a 25 min+30 sec increment rapid game must also be played on one of the boards.

For the 2008 season, the league has attracted 26 GMs, three IMs, and eleven WGMs. This season, ten teams are competing over 18 rounds in six different cities in a six-month period, from March to August.

For the 2009 season, the league was won by Shanghai, with the top male and female scorers being Wang Hao and Ju Wenjun respectively.

Clubs and players
Ten teams are represented:

Beijing Aigo Team 北京爱国者国际象棋队
Ye Jiangchuan
Li Chao
Yu Yangyi
Zhao Xue
Wang Yu
Arman Pashikian (Armenia)

China Mobile Group Chongqing Company Ltd 重庆移动通信国际象棋队
Liang Chong
Wang Chen
Huang Qian
Tan Zhongyi
Alexander Motylev (Russia)
Zhang Zhong (Singapore)

Hebei 国台酒河北国际象棋队
Wang Hao
Zhang Pengxiang
Peng Xiaomin
Wang Rui
Guo Jin
Wang Doudou
Zhai Mo

Jiangsu 蓝珀通信江苏队
Zhou Weiqi
Xu Jun
Lin Chen
Wu Wenjin
Ruan Lufei
Wei Yi
Shen Yang
Guo Qi
Dyland Xue (United States)

Shandong 山东玲珑轮胎队
Bu Xiangzhi
Zhao Jun
Wen Yang
Wu Kaiyu
Hou Yifan
Zhang Jilin
Sun Xinyue
Vladimir Akopian (Armenia)

Bank of Qingdao 青岛银行队
Tong Yuanming
Liu Qingnan
Chen Peng
Sun Fanghui
Zhou Min
Wesley So (Philippines)
Vera Nebolsina (Russia)
Pentala Harikrishna (India)
Elena Tairova (Russia)
Mikhail Kobalia (Russia)
Nana Dzagnidze (Georgia)

Qingdao Yucai 青岛育才中学国际象棋队
Xiu Deshun
Ma Qun
Wan Yunguo
Zhang Ziyang
Gu Xiaobing
Gong Qianyun
Liang Zhihua
Ernesto Inarkiev (Russia)
Hoang Thi Bao Tram (Vietnam)
Peng Zhaoqin (Netherlands)

Shanghai 上海建桥学院国际象棋队
Ni Hua
Zhou Jianchao
Lou Yiping
Lu Yijie
Ju Wenjun
Zhang Xiaowen
Andrei Volokitin (Ukraine)

Tianjin 天津南开大学国际象棋队
Wang Yue
Li Haoyu
Xu Hanbing
Xu Yong
Ning Chunhong
Anna Muzychuk (Slovenia)
Batkhuyag Munguntuul (Mongolia)

Zhejiang 浙江队
Ding Liren
Yu Lie
Lu Shanglei
Jia Haoxiang
Xu Yuhua
Ding Yixin
Wang Xiaohui
Alexey Dreev (Russia)
Zhu Chen (Qatar)
Nikita Vitiugov (Russia)
Vladimir Malakhov (Russia)
Vladimir Belov (Russia)

See also 
Chinese Chess Association
Chess in China

Other leagues
United States Chess League
Chess Bundesliga - Germany
4NCL - the British-based Four Nations Chess League

References

External links
Official site of the China Chess League (Chinese)
Chinese Chess League history 2005-2013 from OlimpBase

Chess competitions
Chess in China